Eugenio Boches (born 13 August 1939) is a Guatemalan boxer. He competed in the men's light middleweight event at the 1968 Summer Olympics. At the 1968 Summer Olympics, he lost to Mario Benítez of Uruguay.

References

1939 births
Living people
Guatemalan male boxers
Olympic boxers of Guatemala
Boxers at the 1968 Summer Olympics
Sportspeople from Guatemala City
Light-middleweight boxers